Calliarthron tuberculosum is a species of thalloid intertidal alga.

Distribution and habitat 

Calliarthron tuberculosum is found on the west coast of North America, from the Baja California Peninsula to the Alaska Panhandle.

South of Monterey Bay, California,  C. tuberculosum overlaps with C. cheilosporioides; as the two species are quite similar, distinguishing the two can be quite hard.  Molecular sequencing or detailed measurements are required to separate them.

It is commonly found in "low intertidal tidepools in moderate to exposed habitats".

References

Corallinaceae